The Clock Tower of Tirana, was built in 1822 in Tirana, Albania by Et'hem bey Mollaj, a Bejtexhinj poet who also finished the Et'hem Bey Mosque next to the clock tower. Watchmaster Ismail Tufina was the first to assemble the Tirana clock mechanism in 1822. It is a monument of culture of first category, approved on 24 May 1948.

The stairs have 90 steps that go in a spiral fashion. Since the restoration of 2016, 9,833 visitors were counted, who have visited the tower. The installation of the clock was done by the renowned Tufina watchmakers. The Tufina's took care of the clock from 1822 until 1973 when forcefully removed by the communist regime.

History 

The clock tower was built by the Ottoman Turks in an Islamic style and with simply a bell from Venice to be rung every hour. Ismail Tufina was the first watchmaker of the clock tower in 1822. In 1916 during World War I the clock was damaged. It took until 1928 to put a new mechanism. The new mechanism was purchased in Germany at the price of 13,300 golden francs, which was funded from the wealthiest families in the city and by the Tirana Municipality. Watchmaker Arif Tufina and his sons installed the new mechanism.  Due to the mechanism being bigger than the actual tower they constructed an extra 5 meters on the tower and a new roof.

In 1928, the Municipality of Tirana purchased an actual clock from Germany necessitating a rebuilding of the upper floors.  The clock was destroyed by bombardments during World War II and was replaced in 1946 with a Roman numeral clock from a church in Shkodër. In 1970, the Roman numeral clock was replaced by a Chinese clock. Bahri Tufina and Zija Tufina tended to the Clock Tower of Tirana up until 1973 when the communists forbade them from doing so. This decision was made based on the communist party’s unfair prejudice against such wealthy families. The tower underwent renovation in 1981 and also in 1999. Access to the top of the tower has been available free of charge since 1996. A new restoration is ongoing by The Municipality of Tirana in 2010 for tourists.

Architecture

Its base (ground floor) is squared and in the upper part of the premises is the clock mechanism. The clock tower has only a gate for entrance.
The lower part was built with thick stone walls supporting wooden stairs that lead to the top of the tower. Lighting is provided by narrow windows. The tower's upper portion reflects the modifications made in 1928 to accommodate and protect the mechanisms of an actual clock. The tower was last restored in 2016 by the Municipality. Occasionally, mahya lights are strung up between the clock tower and the minaret of the Et'hem Bey Mosque, especially during festive seasons such as Ramadan and Bajram.

Gallery

See also 

 Landmarks in Tirana
 Culture of Tirana

References

External links 
  Kulla e Sahatit 

Tirana
Cultural Monuments of Albania
Towers completed in 1822
Buildings and structures in Tirana
Tourist attractions in Tirana
Ottoman architecture in Albania
1822 establishments in the Ottoman Empire
 1822